Roda-Roda is a Malay language motorcycle magazine published in Malaysia. It is published monthly since 1986 by Bayu Enterprise based at Bukit Rahman Putra, Sungai Buloh, Selangor.

Besides of motorcycle news and test ride reviews of the latest motorcycle models available in Malaysia as well as motorcycle racing reviews such as MotoGP and Malaysian Cub Prix, Roda-Roda also features test ride reviews and news related to motorcycles in other countries through its two journalists overseas, consisting Alan Cathcart (European region) and Clement Salvadori (American region).

References

1986 establishments in Malaysia
Magazines published in Malaysia
Magazines established in 1986
Malay-language magazines
Monthly magazines
Motorcycle magazines